Francis Brewster (1623 – 3 June 1671) was an English politician who sat in the House of Commons in 1653 and 1656.

Brewster was the son of Robert Brewster of Wrentham Hall, Suffolk, by his wife Amy, daughter of Sir Thomas Corbet of Sprowston, Norfolk (Sprowston Hall). He was therefore a nephew of the regicide Miles Corbet. He matriculated from St Catharine's College, Cambridge at Easter 1642 and was admitted  at Gray's Inn on 26 May 1646. In 1653, he was nominated as Member of Parliament for Suffolk in the Barebones Parliament. He was elected MP for Dunwich in 1656 for the Second Protectorate Parliament, on the occasion on which his father interrupted his tenure of that seat to sit for the County.

He married Cicely, the daughter and coheiress of Sir Charles Crofts of Bardwell, Suffolk and had 2 daughters. Amy, the eldest, married Sir Philip Skippon, MP for Dunwich. He was succeeded by his brother Robert Brewster (died 1681), to whom Wrentham Hall passed.

References

1623 births
1671 deaths
Members of Gray's Inn
Alumni of St Catharine's College, Cambridge
Place of birth missing
People from Wrentham, Suffolk
English MPs 1653 (Barebones)
English MPs 1656–1658